Fagne or Fagnes can refer to:

Fagne, a natural region in southern Belgium and northern France, sometimes grouped with Famenne as Fagne-Famenne.
The High Fens, a marshy area in eastern Belgium and western Germany.
1593 Fagnes, an asteroid.